(born 3 January 1990) is a Japanese professional footballer who plays as a forward or an attacking midfielder for Tokushima Vortis.

Club career

Cerezo Osaka
Born in Osaka, Kakitani joined Cerezo Osaka's youth team at the age of 4. In 2006, he signed his first professional contract with Cerezo at 16 – the club record for the youngest player signed to a professional contract. He played his first J-League game on 26 November 2006. He also trained with the Arsenal F.C. and Inter Milan youth teams.

Kakitani entered the e-School of Human Sciences, Waseda University in 2008. Kakitani was loaned to Tokushima Vortis on 18 June 2009 and returned to Cerezo Osaka in 2012.

Basel
On 7 July 2014 FC Basel announced that they had signed Kakitani on a four-year contract. Kakitani joined Basel to the start of the 2014–15 Swiss Super League season. He joined the team on 17 July for their 2014–15 season under head coach Paulo Sousa. Kakitani played his domestic league debut for the club in the away game in the Stockhorn Arena on 2 August, coming on as a substitute for Mohamed Elneny as Basel won 3–2 against Thun. He scored his first goal for his new club one week later, on 9 August, in the home game in the St. Jakob-Park as Basel won 4–1 against Zürich. The season 2014–15 was a successful one for Basel. Basel entered the Champions League in the group stage. They reached the knockout phase on 9 December 2014, as they managed a 1–1 draw at Anfield against Liverpool. But they were knocked out of the competition by Porto in the round of 16. At the end of the 2014–15 season, Basel won the championship for the sixth time in a row. In the 2014–15 Swiss Cup Basel reached the final. However for the third time in a row they finished as runners-up. However, Kakitani failed to make a lasting impression in this season under trainer Paulo Sousa. Of the 50 competition matches (36 Swiss League fixtures – 6 Swiss Cup and 8 Champions League) that Basel played that season, Kakitani appeared in just 28.

In their following season new head coach was Urs Fischer and under him Kakitani played only in seven games. Being unhappy, he decided to return to Japan. During his 18 months with the club, Kakitani played a total of 41 games for Basel scoring a total of 14 goals. 18 of these games were in the Swiss Super League, six in the Swiss Cup, three in the 2014–15 Champions League and 14 were friendly games. He scored four goals in the domestic league, four in the cup and the other six were scored during the test games.

Return to Cerezo Osaka
Unable to establish himself at Basel in the first half of the 2015–2016 season, Kakitani left the club in early January 2016 returning to his home club Cerezo Osaka which had been relegated to the J2 League during his absence. The team has been playing in the J1 League since the 2017 season.

Return to Tokushima Vortis
On 6 January 2023, Kakitani announcement officially return to former club, Tokushima Vortis for upcoming 2023 season, he played for the club on loan in the middle of the 2009 season.

International career
He was named Most Valuable Player in the AFC U-17 Championship 2006 after helping Japan win the tournament, scoring 4 goals.

Kakitani scored two goals at 2007 FIFA U-17 World Cup in South Korea. Against France he scored a spectacular goal from the halfway line.

Kakitani debuted for the Japan senior team at the 2013 EAFF East Asian Cup. He played his first international match against China, scoring his first international goal in the 59th minute. He then scored twice against South Korea in a 2–1 win. His three goals from three matches made him top goalscorer as Japan won the tournament.

Career statistics

Club
.

International

Under-17
Scores and results list Japan's goal tally first, score column indicates score after each Kakitani goal.

Under-20
Scores and results list Japan's goal tally first, score column indicates score after each Kakitani goal.

Senior team
Scores and results list Japan's goal tally first, score column indicates score after each Kakitani goal.

Honours
Basel
 Swiss Super League: 2014–15, 2015–16

Cerezo Osaka
 J.League Cup: 2017
 Emperor's Cup: 2017

Nagoya Grampus
J.League Cup: 2021

Japan
EAFF East Asian Cup: 2013

Japan U-17
AFC U-17 Championship: 2006

Individual
AFC U-17 Championship Most Valuable Player: 2006
EAFF East Asian Cup Top Scorer: 2013
J. League Division 1 Player of the Month: May 2013

References

External links
 
 
 Japan National Football Team Database
 
 Profile at Cerezo Osaka 
 Personal Site 

1990 births
Living people
Association football people from Osaka Prefecture
Sportspeople from Osaka
Japanese footballers
Association football midfielders
Japan youth international footballers
Japan international footballers
2014 FIFA World Cup players
J1 League players
J2 League players
Swiss Super League players
Cerezo Osaka players
Tokushima Vortis players
Nagoya Grampus players
FC Basel players
Japanese expatriate footballers
Japanese expatriate sportspeople in Switzerland
Expatriate footballers in Switzerland